Nava Yuva Samiti (New Youth Association)  is the youth wing of Communist Party of India (Marxist-Leninist) in Andhra Pradesh.

Youth wings of communist parties of India